The 1925 Duluth Kelleys season was their third in the National Football League and final season as the Kelleys. The team failed to improve on their previous record against league opponents of 5–1, losing three games. They tied for sixteenth place in the league.

Schedule

 Games in italics are against non-NFL teams.

Standings

References

Duluth Kelleys seasons
Duluth Kelleys
1925 in sports in Minnesota
National Football League winless seasons